Changsha Ferris Wheel is a -tall giant Ferris wheel in Changsha, Hunan, China that has a diameter of . It is adjacent to Helong Stadium.  

It was completed on September 30, 2004, and officially opened to the public on October 1, 2004.

Changsha Ferris Wheel is one of four 120 m Ferris wheels in China, the other three being Suzhou Ferris Wheel (completed 2009), Tianjin Eye (completed 2008), and Zhengzhou Ferris Wheel (completed 2003). The only Chinese Ferris wheel with a greater height is the -tall Star of Nanchang, which opened in 2006.

References 

Ferris wheels in China
Buildings and structures in Changsha